The 104th Guards Air Assault Regiment is a formation of the Russian Airborne Troops. It is part of the 76th Guards Air Assault Division.

History 
The regiment was formed on 24 September 1948 in Valga, Karelian ASSR as the 104th Guards Air-Landing Regiment of the 21st Guards Airborne Division. In 1955, its garrison was moved to Cherekha, Pskov Oblast. It was awarded the Order of the Red Banner in 1978. In 2014, the regiment was involved in the War in Donbass. In 2022, the regiment participated in the 2022 Russian invasion of Ukraine. The regiment has suffered very heavy casualties including at least four battalion commanders. On 7 June 2022, Ukraine's 80th Air Assault Brigade claimed that they had destroyed the regiment in a battle on a highway in the Donbas. The regiment has been accused of participating in the Bucha massacre by Ukrainian prosecutors.

References 

Regiments of the Russian Airborne Troops
Military units and formations established in 1948
Airborne units and formations of the Soviet Union
Military units and formations of Russia in the war in Donbas